Tough Target is an American television talk show that aired from 1995 to 1996.  The show focused on issues of crime and how to prevent oneself from being a victim.  It was hosted by safety specialist J. J. Bittenbinder.

References

External links
 

1995 American television series debuts
1990s American television talk shows
Law enforcement in the United States